Kürkçü (in Turkish meaning Furrier) may refer to:

 Kürkçü, Alaca
 Kürkçü, Bor, village in Niğde Province, Turkey
 Kürkçü, Mut, village in Mersin Province, Turkey
 Kürkçü, Şenkaya
 Kürkçü Han (Furriers' Inn), a part of Istanbul Grand Bazaar